{{DISPLAYTITLE:NZR OA class}}

The OA class is a solitary steam locomotive built by the Baldwin Locomotive Works for the Wellington and Manawatu Railway (WMR) in New Zealand. Ordered in 1894, it entered service in August of that year as No. 13 and was the first narrow gauge Vauclain compound in the world. In 1908, the WMR and its locomotive fleet were purchased by New Zealand Railways Department (NZR) and incorporated into the national rail network, and, although No. 13 bore a likeness to members of the O class, it was sufficiently different that it warranted separate classification. The designation of OA was created and it was numbered OA 457.  It operated for another two decades until it was withdrawn in December 1929 in Auckland. The locomotive was known to WMR staff as "The Lady".

In 1896, a locomotive similar in appearance was ordered by the WMR, No. 16. Its technical specifications were such that when it was acquired by NZR it was classified separately and became the sole member of the OC class.

References

Bibliography

External links
Drawing of an OA/OC class locomotive from Derek Brown

Oa class
2-8-0 locomotives
Baldwin locomotives
Vauclain compound locomotives
Scrapped locomotives
Railway locomotives introduced in 1894
3 ft 6 in gauge locomotives of New Zealand